Afjet Afyonspor is a Turkish professional football club based in Afyonkarahisar, which currently competes in the TFF Second League, the third level of Turkish football.

Current squad

Other players under contract

References

External links
Official website
Afjet Afyonspor on TFF.org

Football clubs in Turkey
Sport in Afyonkarahisar
Association football clubs established in 2013
2013 establishments in Turkey